Urban Surrealism is an art scene prominent in architecture, drawing and painting, literature, music and drama, where emphasizing the unorthodox, bizarre and novelty parts of an artistic piece, while retaining simplicity, is key. It is inspired by comedy and satire, and has an amusing personality as a genre. An important element of urban surrealism is a rather comical approach to the high class, or the ruling class, which means that urban surreal art, with its high quality, may attract the aristocracy, while still being casually produced regarding its structure.

References

Surrealism